The 2018 Hawaii Rainbow Warriors football team represented the University of Hawaii at Manoa in the 2018 NCAA Division I FBS football season. The Rainbow Warriors played their home games at Aloha Stadium in Honolulu. They competed in the West Division of the Mountain West Conference and were led by third-year head coach Nick Rolovich. They finished the season 8–6, 5–3 in Mountain West play to finish in a tie for second place in the West Division. They were invited to the Hawaii Bowl where they lost to Louisiana Tech. The Rainbow Warriors clinched their first winning season since 2010 with a 31-30 overtime win at San Diego State, while also clinching a winning conference record in the process.

Previous season
The Rainbow Warriors finished the 2017 season 3–9, 1–7 in Mountain West play to finish in a tie for fifth place in the West Division.

Preseason

Award watch lists
Listed in the order that they were released

Mountain West media days
During the Mountain West media days held July 24–25 at the Cosmopolitan on the Las Vegas Strip, the Rainbow Warriors were predicted to finish in fifth place in the West Division.

Media poll

Preseason All-Mountain West Team
The Rainbow Warriors had one player selected to the preseason all-Mountain West team.

Defense

Jahlani Tavai – LB

Schedule

Staff 

Coaching Source

Game summaries

at Colorado State

Navy

Sophomore quarterback Cole McDonald was named Mountain West Offensive player of the week. He finished 30–41 for 428 yards and six touchdowns.

Rice

at Army

Duquesne

at San Jose State

Wyoming

at BYU

Nevada

at Fresno State

Utah State

UNLV

at San Diego State

Louisiana Tech–Hawaii Bowl

Players drafted into the NFL

References

Hawaii
Hawaii Rainbow Warriors football seasons
Hawaii Rainbow Warriors football